is a Japanese record label, a subsidiary of Sony Music Entertainment Japan.

Artists
Their artists include L'Arc-en-Ciel, Asian Kung-Fu Generation, Home Made Kazoku, Puffy AmiYumi, Polysics, Supercar, Pushim, Chatmonchy, Denki Groove, Tomoe Shinohara, The Babystars, DOES, KANA-BOON, Guitar Wolf, Miki Furukawa, Nico Touches the Walls, plingmin, Joe Inoue, Sid, Merengue, Acid Android, Piko, Domino, Prague, Lama, Group Tamashii, Totalfat, Hemenway, Negoto, Unicorn, Chara, Folks, Scenarioart, Blue Encount, Lenny Code Fiction, FlowBack, and Ive.

Labels
 Haunted Records
 Ki/oon Music (main)
 Ki/oon Overseas
 Loopa
 Neosite Discs (typeset NeOSITE DISCS) - founded in 1996.

VOCALOID
In December 2010, Ki/oon Records released their own Vocaloid product Utatane Piko.

See also
 List of record labels
 I Say Yeah!, the 10th anniversary single from Neosite Discs.

References

External links

Sony Music Entertainment Japan
Sony subsidiaries
Japanese record labels
Record labels established in 1992
Vocaloid production companies
Mass media companies based in Tokyo